Aloi is a town in northern Uganda.

Refugees 
Aloi hosts a large refuge camp with 20,000 residents from Burundi.

Transport 
Aloi is served by a station on the national railway network.

See also 
 Railway stations in Uganda

References 

Populated places in Uganda